Propargyl chloride is an organic compound with the formula HC2CH2Cl.  It is a colorless liquid and a lacrymator. It is an alkylating agent that is used in organic synthesis.

See also 
 Allyl chloride
 Propargyl
 Propargyl alcohol

References

External links
 Entry at ChemSpider

Propargyl compounds
Organochlorides